Hector McKinlay (born 29 July 1940) was a Scottish footballer who played for Falkirk, Dundee United and Dumbarton.

References

1940 births
Scottish footballers
Dumbarton F.C. players
Falkirk F.C. players
Dundee United F.C. players
Scottish Football League players
Living people
Association footballers not categorized by position